The following lists events that happened during 1900 in New Zealand.

Incumbents

Regal and viceregal
Head of State – Queen Victoria
Governor – The Earl of Ranfurly GCMG

Government and law
The 14th New Zealand Parliament continued. Government was

Speaker of the House – Sir Maurice O'Rorke
Prime Minister – Richard Seddon
Minister of Finance – Richard Seddon
Chief Justice – Sir Robert Stout

Parliamentary opposition
 Leader of the Opposition – William Russell (Independent).

Main centre leaders
Mayor of Auckland – David Goldie
Mayor of Wellington – John Aitken
Mayor of Christchurch – Charles Louisson, William Reece
Mayor of Dunedin – Robert Chisholm

Events 

15 January: The New Zealand Mounted Rifles rout a Boer assault at Slingersfontein, South Africa.
 9 February: Opening of the Wanganui Opera House by premier Richard Seddon.
15 February: New Zealand troops are part of the relief of Kimberley, South Africa.
3 May: Holy Cross College, Mosgiel (Roman Catholic seminary) established.
 May: Phosphate discovered on Nauru – mining begins later in the year.
 May–June: Tour of Pacific islands by Prime Minister Richard Seddon. Tonga, Niue, Fiji and the Cook Islands are visited.
28 September: The New Zealand Government votes to incorporate the Cook Islands into New Zealand.
 October: The number of European electorates in the New Zealand Parliament is increased to 76.
 23 October: The country's first electric tram service begins, between Roslyn and Maori Hill in Dunedin.

Unknown date
Māori Lands Administration Act passed.
George Hemmings brings the first motor car into the South Island.
The General Assembly Library (part of the New Zealand Parliament Buildings) is built.
18 people die in a boating tragedy on the Motu River.

Arts and literature

See 1900 in art, 1900 in literature, :Category:1900 books

Music

See: 1900 in music

Film

Alfred Henry Whitehouse's The Departure of the Second Contingent for the Boer War – the oldest known surviving New Zealand film – premieres.

Sport

Athletics
National champions (Men):
100 yards – G. Smith (Auckland)
250 yards – G. Smith (Auckland)
440 yards – W Strickland (Hawke's Bay)
880 yards – J Lynskey (Canterbury)
1 mile – W Simpson (Canterbury)
3 miles – W Simpson (Canterbury)
120 yards hurdles – G. Smith (Auckland)
440 yards hurdles – G. Smith (Auckland)
Long jump – Te Rangi Hīroa (Otago)
High jump – C Laurie (Auckland)
Pole vault – C Laurie (Auckland)
Shot put – W Madill (Auckland)
Hammer throw – W Madill (Auckland)

Badminton
The first club is formed, in Auckland, but soon goes into recess. (see also 1927)

Chess
National Champion: W.E. Mason of Wellington.

Cricket
 See 1900–01 New Zealand cricket season
A tour of New Zealand by Australia's Melbourne Cricket Club included seven matches, of which the visitors won six with one match drawn.
Six provincial matches were played during the 1899–1900 domestic season, all of them over two or three days, with wins by Otago over Hawke's Bay and Canterbury, by Wellington and Auckland over Otago, and by Canterbury and Auckland over Wellington.
 Scores were uniformly low by modern standards, mostly below 200, with only two centuries scored and only one team total of over 300 runs: the highest team total was 464 by Wellington against Otago, with centuries by F A Midlane (149) and C A Richardson (113), and the best bowling figures were A D Downes' 7–43 for Otago against Canterbury.

Golf
The 8th National Amateur Championships were held in Otago
 Men: Arthur Duncan (Wellington) – 2nd title
 Women: K Rattray (Otago) – 3rd title

Horse racing

Harness racing
 Auckland Trotting Cup: Cob

Thoroughbred racing
New Zealand Cup winner: Fulmen Ideal
New Zealand Derby winner: Renown
Auckland Cup winner: Blue Jacket
Wellington Cup winner: Djin Djin
Top New Zealand stakes earner: Advance
Leading flat jockey: C Jenkins (50 wins)

Polo
Savile Cup winners: Oroua (A Strang, J Strang, W Strang, O Robinson)

Rowing
Men's national champions (coxed fours): Picton
Men's national champions (coxless pairs): Wellington
Men's national champions (double sculls): Canterbury
Men's national champions (single sculls): T Spencer (Wellington)

Rugby union
Provincial club rugby champions include: City (Auckland); Westport (Buller); Christchurch (Canterbury); Pirates (Hawke's Bay); Levin (Horowhenua); Awarua (Marlborough); Alhambra (Otago); Gisborne (Poverty Bay); Hawera (Taranaki); Kaierau (Wanganui); Melrose (Wellington); winners of Bush, Nelson, and Wairarapa club competitions unknown.
see also :Category:Rugby union in New Zealand

Shooting
Ballinger Belt – no competition

Soccer
Provincial league champions:
	Auckland:	Grafton AFC (Auckland)
	Otago:	Roslyn Dunedin
	Wellington:	Diamond Wellington

Swimming
National champions (men):
100 yards freestyle – G.A. Tyler
220 yards freestyle – G.A. Tyler
440 yards freestyle – G.A. Tyler

Tennis
New Zealand championships:
Men's singles: J Hooper
Women's singles: K Nunneley
Men's doubles: C Cox/J Collins
Women's doubles: K Nunneley/E Harman

References: Romanos, J. (2001) New Zealand Sporting Records and Lists. Auckland: Hodder Moa Beckett.

Births
4 January: Lance Richdale, ornithologist
19 January: Jerry Skinner, politician, deputy Prime Minister (in Australia)
4 February: Kazimierz Wodzicki
13 March: Quentin Donald
25 March: Lewis Harris
4 May: Archibald McIndoe, plastic surgeon
8 May: Lancelot William McCaskill
17 May: Robert Macfarlane
3 June: James Anderson McPherson
9 June: Norman Hargrave Taylor
4 July: Rudall Hayward, filmmaker
 27 July (as Nina Betts): Nina Byron, silent film actress, dancer.
10 August: Arthur Porritt
11 August: Alexander Astor
1 September: Frederick McDowall
7 September: Nora Sipos
17 September: Hedwig Weitzel
22 September: Henry Ah Kew
23 September: Alwyn Warren
14 October: Eddie McLeod, cricketer
19 October: Edwin Coubray
21 October: Quentin Pope
3 November (in Durham, England): Roger Blunt, cricketer
5 November: Esther James
12 November: Stanley Graham 
23 November: Keith Buttle, mayor of Auckland 
27 November: Gordon Wilson

Deaths
 date unknown: Te Rangitahau
 3 February: Elizabeth Pulman
 3 March: Arthur Halcombe
 12 March: James McDonald, politician
 15 March: William Crowther, Mayor of Auckland, politician
 22 March: Carl Gustav Schmitt
 May: Hirawanu Tapu
 26 May: George Henry Frederick Ulrich 
 27 May: Ebenezer Hamlin, politician 
 20 July (in England): Andrew Russell; farmer, politician and soldier
 28 September: Topi Patuki
 4 October: William Skey
 8 November: Charles O'Neill
 20 or 29 December (approximately, in Rome): Thomas Broham

See also
List of years in New Zealand
Timeline of New Zealand history
History of New Zealand
Military history of New Zealand
Timeline of the New Zealand environment
Timeline of New Zealand's links with Antarctica

For world events and topics in 1900 not specifically related to New Zealand see: 1900

References

External links